Parchin is an Iranian military complex, located about  southeast of Tehran. It is closely linked with the Khojir missile production complex.

Geography
Parchin is located on the bank of the Jajrud (river).

History

Missile engines 
To the northwest of Parchin in the Barjamali Hills, a test range for liquid-propellant missile engines is part of the Shahid Hemmat Industrial Group (SHIG) Khojir research facility  where signature of engine test stand firing, probably including technology from the Russian SS-4 Sandal missile, was confirmed by an American spy satellite in August 1997.

On December 15, 1997, SHIG conducted at least a sixth 1997 test of an engine needed for an  ballistic missile. The test was either the sixth or the eighth during 1997 according to available intelligence.

1997 wind tunnel
It is reported the Russian Central Aerohydrodynamic Institute TsAGI contracted in early 1997 to build a wind tunnel at SHIG, for both Iranian and Russian missile designers to refine the Shahab-3 missile.

2005 IAEA Inspection 
On January 13, 2005,  International Atomic Energy Agency (IAEA) inspectors were allowed access to the Parchin military base as a confidence-building measure. The IAEA inspectors revisited the site in November 2005.

2007 explosion
In November 2007, an explosion occurred in a warehouse. Firefighters successfully extinguished the resulting fire. Four people were injured.

2011 reports of nuclear development
In late 2011, the IAEA said it had observed extensive landscaping, demolition and new construction at the site. In November 2011, the IAEA announced that it had credible information that Parchin was the site of activities aimed at developing a nuclear weapon. In February 2012 the IAEA then sought renewed access to Parchin, which was refused by Iran.

2012 calls for inspection 
On 8 March 2012, the United States, the United Kingdom, France, Germany, Russia and China called on Iran to allow United Nations inspectors to visit the Parchin military site.

2014 explosion 
In early October 2014, the New York Times reported on sabotage concerns arising from a blast that took place at the site. A "huge orange flash" was reportedly seen from Tehran. Two people died.

2015 claims of nuclear weapons programme
In July 2015, there were claims that there was activity in the military complex associated with nuclear weapons, but the mission for Iran in the United Nations stated that there is no nuclear weapon production on the site and that the reactivation is a misconception caused by road reconstruction opposite the Mamloo Dam, near the Parchin Military Complex. Iranian Foreign Minister Mohammad Javad Zarif claimed that the Institute for Science and International Security's analysis of satellite imagery was lies.

In August 2015, the IAEA announced that a small extension to an existing building seems to have been built in Parchin.

On 20 September 2015, Director-General Yukiya Amano of the IAEA went to Parchin, along with Director of Safeguards Tero Varjoranta, to obtain clarifications on the nuclear activities of the site. The next day, Amano professed satisfaction with the samples taken by the Iranians themselves and handed over to the IAEA under "established procedures". IAEA experts were not physically present during the sampling, but Amano said the procedure meets "strict agency criteria" that ensure "the integrity of the sampling process and the authenticity of the samples."

What follows is a verbatim quote of the IAEA report on the September 2015 visit to Parchin:

2015 proof of nuclear weapons programme
In June 2016, IAEA investigators reported to the Wall Street Journal that they had found in December 2015 traces of uranium at the Parchin facility, establishing the first physical evidence of a nuclear weapons programme at the missile complex site, which was nicely displayed in the reference article by satellite photograph.

26 June 2020 explosion 

In the early morning of 26 June 2020, an explosion occurred close to the military base in Parchin. According to the Defense ministry spokesman Davoud Abdi, it was due to "a gas leak" at a "gas storage facility" near the base. In news that was released the next day by the Associated Press, Sentinel-2 satellite images show signs of a vast blackened area in the hills located next to the ammunitions facility and the cruise missile factory at Khojir missile base, which is evidence of an explosion and fire that lit up the night sky in Tehran. On 29 June, the New York Times accused the Iranian government of lying that the blast happened at Parchin, because satellite photographs show the explosion happened at the adjacent Khojir missile production facility.

Collaborations
There have been reports of collaborations between Parchin and Imam Hossein University.

References

External links
 Timeline of Iran's Nuclear Activities – The Iran Primer.

Military installations of Iran
Weapons test sites